520 may refer to:

 520 AD, a Gregorian calendar year
 520 BC, a pre-Gregorian calendar year
 Area code 520
 520 (number)

Astronomy
 520 Franziska, an asteroid
 Abell 520, a galaxy cluster
 Kosmos 520, a Soviet satellite
 NGC 520, a pair of colliding spiral galaxy

Buildings
 520 Park Avenue, New York City, New York, United States
 520 West 28th Street, New York City, New York, United States
 520 West 41st Street, New York City, New York, United States
 520 West End Avenue, New York City, New York, United States

Electronics
 HP 520 Notebook, a business laptop
 Lenovo IdeaPad 520, a discontinued brand of notebook computers
 Nokia Lumia 520, an entry-level smartphone
 Nokia Talkman 520, a portable phone

Literature
 Minuscule 520, a Greek minuscule manuscript

Military
 No. 520 Squadron RAF, a meteorological squadron of the Royal Air Force
 United Nations Security Council Resolution 520

Equipment and vehicles
 Stevens Model 520, a pump-action shotgun
 USS Alacrity (MSO-520), an Ability-class minesweeper

Transportation

Air transportation
 Boeing 520, a family of small turboshaft/turboprop engines

Automobiles
 Datsun 520, a 1965–1972 Japanese light commercial vehicle
 Fiat 520, a 1921–1923, 1927–1930 Italian luxury car series
 Lifan 520, a 2006–2012 Chinese compact sedan

Rail transportation
 South Australian Railways 520 class
 Tin Sau stop, Hong Kong (station code)

Roads and routes
 List of highways numbered 520
 Evergreen Point Floating Bridge, commonly called "520 bridge"

Other uses
 An amorous expression in Chinese Internet slang, sometimes associated with the date 5-20

See also

 
 5200 (disambiguation)